Zachary Bierk (born September 17, 1976) is a Canadian former professional ice hockey player. He played in 47 NHL games with the Tampa Bay Lightning, Minnesota Wild, and Phoenix Coyotes between 1997 and 2004.  On April 6, 2021, he was hired as the goaltending coach with the Ottawa Senators.

Junior career
Bierk was born in Peterborough, Ontario. He spent four years with the Peterborough Petes of the Ontario Hockey League from 1993–94 to 1996–97. In the 1995/96 season, Bierk led the Petes to the Memorial Cup final, where they were defeated by the Granby Prédateurs 4–0 in the final. The following season, Bierk won the OHL goaltender of the year award, the Leo Lalonde trophy as the best over-age player in the league and was named to the OHL All-Star First Team and Canadian Hockey League All-Star Second Team.

Professional career
Bierk was drafted by the Tampa Bay Lightning in the 1995 NHL Entry Draft as their ninth-round pick, #212 overall, from the Peterborough Petes, although he originally expected to be drafted in the fourth or fifth round, and left the draft after he had not been selected by the end of the sixth-round. His first victory came on March 30, 1998 in only his second career start, a 3–1 win in New York against the Rangers.

On January 8, 2003, while playing for the Phoenix Coyotes Bierk and Chicago Blackhawks goaltender Michael Leighton both earned their first NHL shutouts in a 0–0 tie. It was the first time in league history that two goalies had both earned their first career shutouts in the same game.

His final NHL appearance came on November 9, 2003 in a 2–1 overtime loss to the Mighty Ducks of Anaheim.

Bierk finished his career with 47 game appearances, a 9–20–5 record, a 3.18 GAA and a 0.901 save percentage with 1 shutout. Bierk also had 1 assist and 6 penalty minutes.

Post-playing career
Bierk returned to the Coyotes organization in 2017 as the team's goaltending development coach, also serving as the goalie coach of their AHL farm club. He previously served as goalie coach of the Oshawa Generals of the Ontario Hockey League, winning a Memorial Cup with the team in 2015.

Bierk also co-owns and runs a high-level goaltending school in the Greater Toronto Area, known as “Amour Goaltending”.

On April 6, 2021, Bierk was hired as the goaltending coach for the Ottawa Senators.

Bierk family
Bierk is the brother of 
Peterborough, Ontario,  City Councillor, Alex Bierk,
former Skid Row lead singer Sebastian Bach, Canadian actress Dylan Bierk, and Toronto-based artists Jeff, Nick, and Charles Bierk. Bierk is the son of David Bierk, an artist whose paintings are still displayed at the Nancy Hoffman Gallery in New York City. One of Bierk's sisters was a model and his mother is also an artist.

Career statistics

Regular season and playoffs

References

External links
 

1976 births
Living people
Adirondack Red Wings players
Arizona Coyotes coaches
Augusta Lynx players
Canadian ice hockey goaltenders
Canadian people of Norwegian descent
Cleveland Lumberjacks players
Detroit Vipers players
Ice hockey people from Ontario
Minnesota Wild players
Peterborough Petes (ice hockey) players
Phoenix Coyotes players
Sportspeople from Peterborough, Ontario
Springfield Falcons players
Tampa Bay Lightning draft picks
Tampa Bay Lightning players